The Appleton family is an American political, religious and mercantile family.

Family tree

 Samuel Appleton (1586–1670), who emigrated to Ipswich, Massachusetts around 1636. Married (1) 1616: Judith Everard; (2) 1670: Martha 
 Martha Appleton (1620–1659) ∞ Richard Jacob (d.1672)
 John Appleton (1622–1699) ∞ Priscilla Glover (d. 1698)
 John Appleton (1652–1739) ∞ Elizabeth Rogers (d. 1754)
Daniel Appleton (1692–1762)
 Nathaniel Appleton (1693–1784)
Nathaniel Appleton Jr. (1731–1798)
Nathaniel Walker Appleton (1755–1795)
Nathaniel Walker Appleton Jr. (1783–1848)
Charles Tilden Appleton (1809–1859)
 William Channing Appleton (1812–1892)
Charles Henderson Appleton (1784–1831)
Charles Dawes Appleton (1810–1886)
George Dawes Appleton (1818–1890)
 Margaret Appleton (1701–1740) ∞ Edward Holyoke (d. 1769)
 Priscilla (1657–1743) ∞ 1684: Rev. Joseph Capen (1658–1725)
 Samuel Appleton (1624/6–1696) ∞ (1) 1651: Hannah Paine; (2) Mary Oliver (1646–1698)
 Isaac Appleton (1664–1747) ∞ Priscilla Baker
 Isaac Appleton (1704–1794) ∞ Elizabeth Sawyer (1709–1785) 
 Isaac Appleton (1731–1806) ∞ Mary Adams (1741–1827)
 Isaac Appleton (1762–1853)
 Samuel Appleton (1766–1853) ∞ 1799: Mary Gore
 Nathan Appleton (1779–1861) ∞ (1) 1806: Maria Theresa Gold; (2) 1839: Harriet Coffin Sumner
 Thomas Gold Appleton (1812–1884)
 Mary "Molly" Appleton (b. 1813) ∞ Robert James Mackintosh (1806-1864)
 Ronald Mackintosh
 Charles Sedgwick Appleton (1815–1835)
 Frances "Fanny" Elizabeth Appleton (1817–1861) ∞ 1843: Henry Wadsworth Longfellow (1807–1882)
 Charles Appleton Longfellow (1844–1893)
 Ernest Wadsworth Longfellow (1845–1921) ∞ 1868: Harriet "Hattie" Spelman
 Fanny Longfellow (1847–1848)
 Alice Mary Longfellow (1850–1928)
 Edith Longfellow (1853–1915) ∞ Richard Henry Dana III (1851–1931)
 Anne Allegra Longfellow (1855–1934)
 George William Appleton (1826–1827)
 William Sumner Appleton (1840–1903) ∞ Edith Stuart (d. 1892)
 William Sumner Appleton Jr. (1874–1947)
 Harriet Sumner Appleton (1841–1923) ∞ Greely S. Curtis (1830–1897)
 Nathan Appleton Jr. (1843–1906)
 Francis Appleton (1733–1819) ∞ Elizabeth Hubbard (1730–1815)
 John Appleton (1763–1849) ∞ Elizabeth Peabody (d. 1809)
 John Appleton (b. 1804) ∞ 1834: Sarah Newcomb
 John Francis Appleton (1838–1870)
 Elvira Appleton (1804–1852) ∞ George S. Gibson
 Mary Appleton (1764–1820)
 Elizabeth Appleton (1767–1850)
 Rev. Jesse Appleton (1772–1819) ∞ Elizabeth Means (1779–1844)
 Mary Means Appleton (1801–1883) ∞ John Aiken (1797–1867)
 William Appleton Aiken (1833–1929) ∞ Eliza Coit Buckingham (1838–1924) 
  Mary Appleton Aiken ∞ Francis H. Snow (1840–1908)
 Frances Appleton (1804–1839) ∞ Alpheus Spring Packard, Sr. (1798–1884)
 William Alfred Packard (1830–1909)
  Alpheus Spring Packard, Jr. (1839–1905)
 Jane Means Appleton (1806–1863) ∞ U.S. President Franklin Pierce (1804–1869)
 Franklin Pierce, Jr. (1836–1836)
 Franklin "Frank" Robert Pierce (1839–1843)
  Benjamin Pierce (1841–1853)
 William Appleton (1808–1830)
  John Appleton (1814–1817)
 Rev. Joseph Appleton (1751–1795)
 William Appleton (1786–1862) ∞ Mary Ann Cutler (1794-1860)
 William Sullivan Appleton (1815–1836)
 James Amory Appleton (1818–1843) ∞ Mary Ellen Lyman (1819–1875)
 Sarah Elizabeth Appleton (1822–1891) ∞ Amos Adams Lawrence (1814–1886)
 Francis Henry Appleton (1823–1854) ∞ Georgiana Crowninshield Silsbee (1824–1901)
 William Joseph Warren Appleton (1825–1877) ∞ Emily Warren (1818–1905)
 Emily Appleton Beebe (b. 1846) ∞ 1869: J. Arthur Beebe (d. 1911?)
 William Appleton, Jr. (b. 1848) 
 Susan Warren Appleton (1848–1872)
 Edward H. Appleton (1827–1827)
 Harriet Cutler Appleton (1828–1857) ∞ Franklin Gordon Dexter (1824–1903)
 Hetty Sullivan Appleton (1831–1901) ∞ Thomas Jefferson Coolidge (1831–1920)
 Charles Hook Appleton (1833–1874) ∞ Isabella Mason (1835–1869)
 Samuel Appleton (1738–1819) ∞ Mary White (d. 1834)
 Mary Appleton (1773–1829) ∞ Amos Sawyer (d. 1851) 
 John White Appleton (1780–1862) ∞ (1) 1806: Sarah Porter (d. 1809); (2) 1810: Sophia Porter (d. 1860)
 Elisha William Appleton (b. 1810) ∞ 1837: Martha Wylly
 John Howard Appleton (1844–1930)
 Sarah Porter Appleton (b. 1812) ∞ 1845: John Goodenow
 John Appleton (1815–1864)
 Abby Eliza Appleton (b. 1882) ∞ 1841: George Freeman Emery
 Joanna Appleton ∞ (1) Samuel Safford (d. 1816); (2) Eben Dodge (d. 1872)
 James Appleton (1785–1862) ∞ 1807: Sarah Fuller (1787–1872)
 Samuel Gilman Appleton (1808–1873) ∞ 1829: Sarah Gardiner
 Sarah Fuller Appleton (1811–1884) ∞ 1833: Rev. Stephen Caldwell Millett
 James Appleton (1813–1884) ∞ 1842: Sarah Bristol Edwards
 Mary White Appleton (1815–1905)
 Elizabeth Putnam Appleton (1818–1897) ∞ 1845: Shelton L. Hall
 Joanna Dodge Appleton (1821–1870) ∞ 1843: Peyton R. Morgan
 Hannah Fuller Appleton (1823–1903) ∞ Robert Helyer Thayer (1820–1888)
 Daniel Fuller Appleton (1826–1904) ∞ (1) Julia Randall (d. 1886); ∞ (2) 1889: Susan Cowles
 Francis Randall Appleton (1854–1929)
 Harriette Hooper Appleton (1828–1905) ∞ 1849: Rev. John Cotton Smith
 Anna Whittemore Appleton (1831–) ∞ Dr. Charles H. Osgood
 Oliver Appleton (1676–1760) ∞ Sarah Perkins (1677–1770)
 Sarah Appleton  (1709–1798) ∞ (1) 1727: Benjamin Swain; (2) 1752: Benjamin Wyman (d.1774)
 Hannah Appleton (b. 1711) ∞ 1730: Thomas Swain 
  Samuel Appleton (1710–1780) ∞ (1) 1736: Mary Phillips (d. 1737); (2) 1739: Mary Stevens; (3) 1743: Mary Russell (1715–1803)
 Mary (1746–1830) ∞ 1769 Moses Gale (d. 1827)
  Daniel Appleton (1750–1828) ∞ Lydia Ela (1747–1826)
  Daniel Appleton (1785–1849) ∞ 1813: Hannah Adams (1791–1859)
 William Henry Appleton (1814–1899) ∞ 1844: Mary Moody Worthen (1824–1884)
 William Worthen Appleton (1845–1924) ∞ Anna Debois Sargent (1845–1908)
 William Henry Appleton (1866–1951)
 Kate Appleton (1848–1873) ∞ 1872: Hobart Seymour Geary (1838–1918)
 Mary Appleton (d. 1934)
 Henry Cozzens Appleton (1863–1925) ∞ Dora Threlkeld (1847–1927)
 Maria Louisa Appleton (b. 1815) ∞ James E. Cooley (1802–1882)
 John Adams Appleton (1817–1881)
 Charles Horatio Appleton (1819–1820)
 George Swett Appleton (1821–1878) ∞ 1847: Caroline Osgood
 Ellina Appleton (b. 1848) ∞ 1867: William A. Fraser
 Walter Stone Appleton (b. 1849) ∞ Annie P. Beach
 Emma Appleton (b. 1852) ∞ Madan
 George Swett Appleton (1854–1886)
 Francis Appleton (b. 1856)
 Daniel Sidney Appleton (1824–1890) ∞ Melvina W. Marshall (d. 1878)
 Samuel Frances Appleton (1826–1883)
 Sarah Emeline Appleton (1829–1861) ∞ Leopold Bossange
 Sarah (1629–1714) ∞ Rev. Samuel Phillips (d. 1696)
 Judith (1634–1659) ∞ 1657: Samuel Rogers (d. 1693)

Arms

References

 Appleton family
American families of English ancestry
Families from Massachusetts
Political families of the United States